Nouna Airport  is a public use airport located near Nouna, Kossi, Burkina Faso.

See also
List of airports in Burkina Faso

References

External links 
 Airport record for Nouna Airport at Landings.com

Airports in Burkina Faso
Kossi Province